Consumers' Research is a 501(c)(3) non-profit organization established in 1929 by Stuart Chase and F. J. Schlink after the success of their book Your Money's Worth: a study in the waste of the Consumer's Dollar galvanized interest in testing products on behalf of consumers. It published a monthly magazine called Consumers' Research Bulletin. Leading staff from this organization, thwarted in their efforts to establish a collective bargaining unit of a labor union, protested and left to form Consumers Union in 1936. The magazine published by Consumers Union, initially Consumers Union Reports and now called Consumer Reports, gained popularity and market share over the Bulletin and largely supplanted its relevance.

Consumers' Research remained an educational organization whose mission is to increase the knowledge and understanding of issues, policies, products, and services of concern to consumers. It is headquartered in Washington, D.C., and works at the intersection of consumer issues and policy. It is described as a conservative group.

History
Consumers' Research published comparative test results on brand-name products and publicized deceptive advertising claims.

Founding

In 1927 Schlink and Chase, encouraged by the public response to the publishing of their book Your Money's Worth, solicited financial, editorial, and technical support from patrons of other activist magazines to support the creation of an organization to offer consumers the unbiased services of "an economist, a scientist, an accountant, and goodness knows what more." Schlink founded this organization, Consumers' Research, and migrated the existing subscriber base of a White Plains, New York organization's Consumer's Club Commodity List to support the Consumers' Research Bulletin published by his new organization. This was a publication with the mission to "investigate, test and report reliably … hundreds of common commodities purchased." This magazine would "accept no money or compensation of any kind from manufacturers, dealers, advertising agencies or other commercial enterprises." In 1927 the circulation of the bulletin was 565; by 1932 there were 42,000 subscribers. In addition to the magazine the organization also published books, pamphlets, and reports.

In 1933 Schlink and Arthur Kallet, a board member of Consumers' Research and former colleague of Schlink at the American Standards Association, published 100,000,000 Guinea Pigs. The book was to become one of the best-selling books of the decade and the metaphor of consumers being guinea pigs exploited by commercial enterprises moved readers as an appropriate description of the public during the Depression.  Consumers' Research moved in 1933 to Washington, New Jersey and later the Bowerstown in Washington Township, New Jersey. After the move Schlink began to take more control over the management of the organization and rapidly hired and fired many staff. When Schlink established Consumers’ Research he appointed his wife and close friends to compose the majority of seats on the board of directors, and staff noted that he held control of hiring, firing, and the organization's editorial and budget decisions. When the organization grew the staff began to question its mission.

Schlink's control and resulting protests
In 1927 at the start of publication Consumers' Research Bulletin discussed conceptual issues, but by 1934 ratings of products and guidance for purchases filled more than 75% of each issue. Around this time Chase left the organization to pursue other interests, and Schlink began to take more control over management. By 1935 Consumers’ Research had a staff of 50, used 200 consultants, and was sponsored by such respected and established journalists such as Alexander Crosby of The Nation, Arthur Kellog of The Survey, and George Soule of The New Republic. Each of these also wrote in their own magazines about consumer activism.

In the spring of 1935, the workers began to openly complain about management practices. In August 1935 many workers formed a chapter of the Technical, Editorial, and Office Assistant's Union. In response to this, Schlink fired John Heasty, the appointed president of the union, and the union organizers responded with a strike at Consumers Research. Schlink counter-responded to the strike by hiring strikebreakers and armed security and by filing legal grievances against protestors. The negative publicity this dispute attracted pleased Consumers' Research critics.

Kallet seeks a solution
The positions between Consumers' Research and the strikers became more entrenched and less reconcilable, and the strikers began to have more discussions about the working conditions of employees. Arthur Kallet emerged as a leader who proposed the creation of a new organization which would evaluate products and take into account the working conditions under which those products were created. The organization proposed would also engage in and promote boycotts, educational campaigns, and have alliances with other organizations, which were activities Consumers Research avoided.

At the end of 1935, the protesters called for mediation. Reinhold Niebuhr, a religious philosopher, chaired an arbitration group which included the American Civil Liberties Union’s Roger Nash Baldwin, the educator George Counts, and the socialist Norman Thomas. Schlink rejected this arbitration and the Consumers' Research board of directors accused the strikers of being communists.

This organization, Consumers Union, published its first magazine Consumers Union Reports in May 1936. The previous strike was very successful at drawing attention to the protesters and the magazine was founded with public attention and support. Within two years the circulation of this new magazine surpassed the subscriptions to Consumers' Research Bulletin, which the organization continued to publish. As of 1987 it had less than 1% of the subscribers which Consumers Union's magazine had.

Accomplishments
From its New Jersey location, Consumers' Research continually organized petitions to Franklin D. Roosevelt urging him to establish a federal Department of the Consumer. This department would organize all consumer protection agencies and have as goals the prevention of monopoly and prevention of fraud to consumers. Because of Consumers' Research, and women's groups, and home economics activists, there were a Consumer Advisory Board, a labor advisory committee, and a business advisory committee in the National Recovery Administration. In 1933 Roosevelt appointed Mary Harriman Rumsey to head the Consumer Advisory Board. Caroline F. Ware, Paul Douglas, Walton Hale Hamilton, and Dexter Keezer were other consumer representatives involved in this effort.

Legacy
Consumers' Research was a founding organization in the consumer protection movement.

The establishment of Consumers Union, directly resulting from the staff dismissals and walkouts from Consumers' Research, was one of the major events influencing the consumer movement after World War I. Other important organizations formed in the same era were the New Deal programs aimed at promoting economic recovery after the Great Depression by increasing consumer representation in the market, with the Consumer Advisory Board within the National Recovery Administration and the Consumers' Counsel within the United States Department of Agriculture being notable among them.

Targeting "wokeness"
In 2021, Consumers' Research launched an ad campaign to combat "wokeness" in corporate America, targeting companies by name, including Major League Baseball, Ticketmaster, Coca-Cola, American Airlines and Nike.

In 2022, insurance company State Farm partnered with GenderCool, a group whose mission is to present positive stories about transgender and nonbinary youth, to support a program providing LGBTQ-themed children's books to teachers and libraries in Florida. Consumers' Research ran an advertising campaign calling State Farm "a creepy neighbor" and accusing the insurance company of targeting children with books about gender identity. After an online uproar, State Farm dropped its support of the GenderCool partnership.

References

Further reading

External links
 
 An Inventory to the Records of Consumers' Research, Inc., 1910-1983. (MC 3) Finding aid to the archival collection held by Special Collections and University Archives, Rutgers University Libraries. Includes a detailed history of Consumers' Research, a chronology of events, brief biographies of the major people involved, a description of the contents of the collection, and a container list.
 

Consumer organizations in the United States
Consumer magazines
Organizations established in 1929